David Reesor (January 18, 1823 – April 28, 1902) was an Ontario businessman and political figure. He was a Liberal member of the Senate of Canada for King's division from 1867 to 1901.

He was born in Reesorville (later the Village of Markham), Upper Canada in 1823 to parents Abraham Reesor (1790–1831) and Anna Dettwiler (1787 - 1854), descended from Pennsylvania Dutch Mennonite immigrants who first settled in Lancaster County, Pennsylvania. David was the nephew of Abraham Stouffer, founder of Stouffville, and of Peter Reesor, co-founder of Reesorville (later Markham) and Cedar Valley. In 1848, he married Emily McDougall, who was the sister of politician William McDougall. Reesor was editor of the Markham Economist. He was also a magistrate and notary public, reeve of Markham, Ontario (1851, 1856–57 and 1859–1860) and served as warden for York and Peel counties. Though Reesor came from a pacifist Mennonite background, he became a lieutenant-colonel in the local militia. He was elected to the Legislative Council of the Province of Canada for King's division in 1860 and served until Confederation, when he was named to the Senate. During the debates preceding Confederation, Reesor supported an elected Senate. He resigned in 1901.

He died at Rosedale in north Toronto in 1902 and buried with wife at Mount Pleasant Cemetery, Toronto. His home at 166 Main Street North in Markham (built 1876) still stands. Senator Reesor’s Drive in Markham is named in his honour.

Reesor married Emily McDougall in 1847, who was the sister to Father of Confederation William McDougall.

References

External links

A Cyclopedia of Canadian Biography. Being chiefly men of the time, ed. G.M. Rose (Toronto, 1888).
 The Canadian parliamentary companion, ed. C.H. Mackintosh & J.A. Gemmill (Ottawa, 1889).
The Canadian biographical dictionary and portrait gallery of eminent and self-made men, (Toronto, 1880), pp. 697f.
Commemorative biographical record of the county of York, Ontario, (Toronto, 1907).

1823 births
1902 deaths
Canadian Methodists
Canadian senators from Ontario
Liberal Party of Canada senators
Members of the Legislative Council of the Province of Canada
19th-century Methodists
Canadian newspaper editors
Canadian male journalists
Mayors of Markham, Ontario
Canadian militia officers